Wolfgang Petersen (14 March 1941 – 12 August 2022) was a German film director, screenwriter, and producer. He was nominated for two Academy Awards for the World War II submarine warfare film Das Boot (1981). His other films include The NeverEnding Story (1984), Enemy Mine (1985), In the Line of Fire (1993), Outbreak (1995), Air Force One (1997), The Perfect Storm (2000), Troy (2004), and Poseidon (2006).

Early life
Petersen was born on 14 March 1941 in Emden, the son of a naval officer. From 1953 to 1960, Petersen attended the Gelehrtenschule des Johanneums in Hamburg.

He made his first films with an 8 mm camera while still at school. In the 1960s he was directing plays at Hamburg's Ernst Deutsch Theater. After studying theater in Berlin and Hamburg, Petersen attended the Film and Television Academy in Berlin (1966–1970).

Career
Petersen's first productions were for German television, and it was during his work on the popular German Tatort (Crime Scene) TV series that he first met and worked with the actor Jürgen Prochnow — who would later appear as the U-boat captain in Petersen's famous Das Boot. The most famous of his Tatort episodes is Reifezeugnis (Maturity Certificate) from 1977 with the young Nastassja Kinski. He shot 6 Tatort episodes.

Petersen made his first theatrical feature film in 1974, the psychological thriller One or the Other of Us, based on the novel Einer von uns beiden by Horst Bosetzky and published anonymously under his pseudonym and starring Jürgen Prochnow. He next directed the 1977 film Die Konsequenz, a black/white adaptation of Alexander Ziegler's autobiographical novel of homosexual love. In its time, the film was considered so radical that when first broadcast in Germany, the Bavarian network Bayerischer Rundfunk turned off the transmitters rather than broadcast it.

His next feature was the World War II epic Das Boot, released in early 1982. The film chronicles the experiences of a German submarine crew engaged in the "Battle of the Atlantic". Though not an immediate financial success, the film received highly positive reviews and was nominated for six Academy Awards, two of which (for Best Director and Best Adapted Screenplay) went to Petersen; he was also nominated for a BAFTA Award and DGA Award. The film starred Jürgen Prochnow as the U-boat Captain, who became a good example of Petersen's action characters, a man at war who confronts danger and fate at sea.

After The NeverEnding Story (1984), Petersen's first English-language film, he directed Enemy Mine (1985), which was not a critical or box office success. He hit his stride in 1993 with the assassination thriller In the Line of Fire. Starring Clint Eastwood as an angst-ridden presidential Secret Service guard, In the Line of Fire gave Petersen the box office clout he needed to direct another suspense thriller, Outbreak (1995), starring Dustin Hoffman. The 1997 Petersen blockbuster Air Force One did very well at the box office, with generally positive critical reviews from movie critics. For both Air Force One and Outbreak, Petersen teamed up with the German cinematographer Michael Ballhaus, who has also worked frequently with director Martin Scorsese.

By 1998, Petersen was an established Hollywood director, with the power to both re-release his classic Das Boot in a new director's cut and to helm star-studded action-thrillers. As such, he was originally considered to direct the first movie in the Harry Potter film series, Harry Potter and the Philosopher's Stone. Petersen pulled out of the running in March 2000.

In the 2000s, Petersen continued to direct two summer blockbusters, the films The Perfect Storm (2000) and Troy (2004). The success of the former helped his Radiant Productions company to sign a deal with Warner Bros.

Petersen's $160 million epic film Poseidon, a re-telling of the 1969 Paul Gallico novel The Poseidon Adventure (previously adapted for the 1972 disaster film), was released by Warner Bros. in May 2006. The film performed poorly in the U.S., barely exceeding $60 million in domestic box office receipts by early August, but international sales surpassed $121 million.

Although hired to direct the film adaptation of Ender's Game by Orson Scott Card that was scheduled for release in 2008, he later "moved on" from the project. His potential projects included a live-action adaptation of the 2006 anime film Paprika and a film adaptation of the science fiction novel Old Man's War.

After a ten-year hiatus, Petersen returned in 2016 as director of the heist comedy Vier gegen die Bank, his first German-language film since Das Boot in 1981.

Personal life
Petersen's first marriage was with actress ; they had a son. In 1978, he married his assistant Maria Borgel. Petersen moved to Los Angeles in 1986 and subsequently acquired American citizenship.

Death
Petersen died of pancreatic cancer on 12 August 2022, at the age of 81, at his home in Brentwood, Los Angeles, California, United States.

Filmography
Source:

Short films

Feature films

Television
TV movies

TV series

Critical reception

References

External links
 
 
 Wolfgang Petersen at Find a Grave

1941 births
2022 deaths
People from Emden
People from the Province of Hanover
Mass media people from Lower Saxony
German Film Award winners
German film directors
German television directors
German film producers
German expatriates in the United States
People educated at the Gelehrtenschule des Johanneums
Officers Crosses of the Order of Merit of the Federal Republic of Germany
Deaths from cancer in California
Deaths from pancreatic cancer
Burials at Westwood Village Memorial Park Cemetery